Opus Hong Kong is a 12-storey,  residential high-rise completed in 2012 at 53 Stubbs Road on Mid-Levels in Hong Kong. The project was designed by Frank Gehry in collaboration with Ronald Lu and Partners, and developed by Swire Properties. It was Gehry's first Asian residential project.

Additional features on the  site include underground parking, swimming pools, gyms, rainwater recycling for irrigation, and electric car charge systems. A  apartment, taking up the entire eighth floor, became the most expensive apartment in Hong Kong when it was sold for HK$470 million in August 2012 .

The British Consul-General to Hong Kong has resided here since 2013.

See also
 39 Conduit Road

References

External links

 

Frank Gehry buildings
Residential buildings completed in 2012
Residential buildings in Hong Kong
Swire Group
Twisted buildings and structures